Hahns Mill is an unincorporated community in Madison County, in the U.S. state of Missouri.

The community was named after John Hahn, the proprietor of a local gristmill.

References

Unincorporated communities in Madison County, Missouri
Unincorporated communities in Missouri